The following is a list of notable deaths in December 2013.

Entries for each day are listed alphabetically by surname. A typical entry lists information in the following sequence:
Name, age, country of citizenship and reason for notability, established cause of death, reference.

December 2013

1
Alfonso Armada, 93, Spanish general, co-leader of 1981 failed coup d'état.
Heinrich Boere, 92, Dutch-German convicted war criminal, member of the Waffen-SS.
Maria Mambo Café, 68, Angolan politician, Minister of Social Affairs (1982–1986), Governor of Cabinda (1990). 
Maurice Cockrill, 78, British artist.
Stirling Colgate, 88, American physicist.
Richard Coughlan, 66, English drummer (Caravan), pneumonia.
Sylvester Dias, 76, Sri Lankan cricketer.
Walter E. Ellis, 53, American serial killer, natural causes. 
T. R. Fehrenbach, 88, American author and historian.
Verdi Godwin, 87, English footballer.
Lino Grech, 83, Maltese actor, writer and director. 
Edward Heffron, 90, American World War II veteran, portrayed in Band of Brothers.
Jerzy Matałowski, 65, German-born Polish actor.
Fernando Sabogal Viana, 72, Colombian Roman Catholic prelate, Auxiliary Bishop of Bogotá (since 1996).
André Schiffrin, 78, French-born American publisher and editor.
Martin Sharp, 71, Australian artist, emphysema.
Antônio Lino da Silva Dinis, 70, Portuguese-born Brazilian Roman Catholic prelate, Bishop of Itumbiara (since 1999).
Alejandro Urdapilleta, 59, Uruguayan actor.
Dany Vandenbossche, 57, Belgian politician, member of the Federal Parliament (1995–1999) and Flemish Parliament for East Flanders (1999–2009).
James von der Heydt, 94, American lawyer and senior (former chief) judge of the District Court for the District of Alaska.

2
William Allain, 85, American politician, Governor of Mississippi (1984–1988), Attorney General (1980–1984).
Antonio Ansola, 82, Spanish footballer (Real Sociedad).
Iván Bächer, 56, Hungarian writer and journalist.
Bill Beckwith, 38, American contractor (Curb Appeal), motorcycle collision.
Jean-Claude Beton, 88, Algerian-born French businessman, founder of Orangina.
Kevin Crawford, 43, American scholar.
Eva Davies, 88, British Olympic fencer.
Marcelo Déda, 53, Brazilian politician, Governor of Sergipe (since 2007), cancer.
John Ewbank, 64, British-born Australian rock climber.
Rex Garvin, 73, American R&B musician.
Brian Hitchen, 77, British journalist, Editor of the Daily Star (1987–1994) and Sunday Express (1994–1995), traffic collision.
Salim Kallas, 77, Syrian actor and politician.
Toshiko Karasawa, 102, Japanese politician, member of the House of Representatives (1946–1952).
Gary Leadston, 72, Canadian politician, cancer.
Junior Murvin, 67, Jamaican reggae singer ("Police and Thieves").
Joseph Napolitan, 84, American political consultant.
Liam O'Connor, 58, Irish Gaelic football player (Offaly).
Mary Riggans, 78, Scottish actress (Take the High Road, Balamory, Dear Frankie), complications of a stroke.
Pedro Rocha, 70, Uruguayan footballer (Peñarol, São Paulo FC).
Katsumi Satō, 84, Japanese human rights activist, pneumonia.
Vernon Shaw, 83, Dominican politician, President (1998–2003).
Ray Weeks, 83, English cricketer (Warwickshire).
Christopher Evan Welch, 48, American actor (Vicky Cristina Barcelona, Lincoln, Silicon Valley), lung cancer.
Paweł Zenon Woś, 92, Polish World War II veteran.

3
John Albery, 77, British chemist and academic, Master of University College, Oxford (1989–1997).
Fernando Argenta, 68, Spanish journalist, musician and presenter, pancreatic cancer.
Paul Aussaresses, 95, French army general.
Gene Clair, 73, American sound engineer.
Dick Greuel, 85, American politician, member of the Alaska House of Representatives (1953–1961), Speaker (1957–1959).
Khalid Hasan, 76, Pakistani cricketer.
Ronald Hunter, 70, American actor (Along Came Polly, Law & Order, The Big Bang Theory), heart and kidney failure.
Kiptalam Keter, 80–81, Kenyan Olympic sprinter.
Niilo Koponen, 85, American politician, member of the Alaska House of Representatives (1983–1993).
Norbert Kuchinke, 73, German journalist and actor (Autumn Marathon).
Hugh MacDonald, 84, Scottish nationalist activist.
Reda Mahmoud Hafez Mohamed, 61, Egyptian military leader, Commander of the Egyptian Air Force (2008–2012), Minister of Military Production (2013).
Ahmed Fouad Negm, 84, Egyptian vernacular poet.
Avo Paistik, 77, Estonian cartoonist, film director and painter.
Edo Patregnani, 75, Italian footballer.
Ida Pollock, 105, British romance novelist.
Bill Porter, 81, American door-to-door salesman, subject of Door to Door.
Sefi Rivlin, 66, Israeli actor and comedian, throat cancer. 
Frank Rozendaal, 56, Dutch ornithologist.
Sacha Sosno, 76, French sculptor and painter.
Harry Webber, 77, South African Olympic weightlifter.

4
 Hassan al-Laqqis, Lebanese paramilitary officer, senior commander of Hezbollah, shot.
 Robert Allman, 86, Australian operatic baritone.
 McDonald Bailey, 92, British Olympic sprinter (1948), bronze medalist (1952).
 Henry Cubitt, 4th Baron Ashcombe, 89, British peer.
 Charles Grigg, 97, British comics artist (Korky the Cat, Desperate Dan).
Greg Hubick, 62, Canadian professional ice hockey player.
 José Esteban Muñoz, 46, Cuban-born American academic.
Paddy O'Byrne, 83, Irish broadcaster (Radio 702) and actor.
* Joana Raspall i Juanola, 100, Spanish Catalan writer.
Alexander Rennie, 54, South African Olympic slalom canoer (1992), plane crash.
Murarilal Singh, 61, Indian politician, stroke.
Don Williams, 86, American football coach.

5
Pierre Aliker, 106, French Martinican politician and independence activist, complications from a fall.
Fred Bassetti, 96, American architect.
Jean-Luc Benoziglio, 72, Swiss writer. 
Friedrich Carl, 97, German Major in the Heer during World War II and Iron Cross recipient.
Iryna Charnushenka-Stasiuk, 34, Belarusian Olympic long jumper (2008), cancer.
Robert Doerr, 99, American politician and educator, Mayor of San Jose, California (1956–1958).
William B. Edmondson, 86, American diplomat, Ambassador to South Africa (1978–1981).
Günther Förg, 61, German artist.
Monte Fresco, 77, British sports photographer.
Ruperto Inchausti, 95, Bolivian footballer (The Strongest, national team).
Barry Jackson, 75, English actor (Doctor Who, Wimbledon, Midsomer Murders).
John Alan Lee, 80, Canadian writer, academic and political activist, suicide.
Nelson Mandela, 95, South African anti-apartheid activist and politician, President (1994–1999), lung infection.
Tim Marcum, 69, American football coach.
Danny Matt, 85, Israeli major-general.
Vincent Mayers, 79, Guyanese cricketer.
Joe Palumbo, 84, American football player (Virginia Cavaliers), member of College Football Hall of Fame.
Brenda Reneau, 59, American politician, natural causes. 
Cynthia Eagle Russett, 76, American historian, multiple myeloma.
Gerald J. Spitz, 72, American politician, sarcoidosis.
David Vestal, 89, American photographer, educator, and author.
Colin Wilson, 82, English writer.

6
Georges Baal, 75, Hungarian psychoanalyst, director, actor, theater therapist and professor, heart attack.
Eddie Britt, 87, Australian politician, member of the New South Wales Legislative Assembly for Willoughby (1978–1981).
Jean-Pierre Desthuilliers, 74, French poet.
Robert Ellis, 87, American mathematician, specializing in topological dynamics.
Philippe Favre, 51, Swiss racing driver, skiing accident.
Hakem al-Fayez, Jordanian politician.
Maurice Griffe, 92, French screenwriter.
Louis Jacobson, 95, Irish cricketer.
Tom Krause, 79, Finnish opera singer.
Gail Collins Pappalardi, 72, American artist and songwriter (Strange Brew).
Peeter Mudist, 71, Estonian painter.
Nya Quesada, 94, Argentine actress.
Alan Robinson, 65, Canadian politician.
Stan Tracey, 86, British jazz pianist.
M. K. Turk, 71, American college basketball coach (Southern Miss).
Louis Waldon, 78, American actor (Lonesome Cowboys, Blue Movie, Flesh), stroke.
Kate Williamson, 82, American actress (Ellen, Disclosure, Dahmer).

7
Vinay Apte, 62, Indian actor.
Juan Carlos Argeñal, 43, Honduran journalist, shot.
Sir Hugh Bidwell, 79, British businessman, Lord Mayor of London (1990).
Alan Bridges, 86, English film and television director (The Shooting Party).
Jack Fishman, 83, American pharmaceutical researcher.
John Idzik, 85, American football player and coach.
Nadezhda Ilyina, 64, Russian Soviet Olympic bronze-medalist athlete (1976), traffic collision.
Eero Kolehmainen, 95, Finnish Olympic silver-medalist cross country skier (1952).
Józef Kowalski, 113, Polish soldier, second-to-last surviving veteran of the Polish–Soviet War.
Jacob Matlala, 51, South African WBO flyweight and light flyweight champion boxer (1993, 1995).
Édouard Molinaro, 85, French film director and screenwriter (La Cage aux Folles).
Allen Rosenberg, 82, American Olympic rowing coach.
Esther Streit-Wurzel, 81, Israeli author.
Thomas B. Spain, 85, American jurist, member of the Supreme Court of Kentucky (1991–1995).
Dharmavarapu Subramanyam, 53, Indian comic actor.
Kei Suma, 78, Japanese actor, liver cancer.
Michael Vetter, 70, German composer and novelist.
Chick Willis, 79, American blues singer, cancer.

8
Orlando Álvarez, 78, Chilean lawyer and writer, Judge of the Supreme Court (1998–2009).
Leonid Baranovskyi, 60, Ukrainian Soviet footballer (Chornomorets).
Sir John Cornforth, 96, Australian-British chemist, laureate of the Nobel Prize (1975).
Wanda Ewing, 43, American artist, small cell lung cancer.
Hung Sin-nui, 88, Chinese Cantonese opera singer and actress.
Jwala, 4, British Thoroughbred racehorse, euthanised.
Lynne Kieran, 53, British-born Austrian singer (The Rounder Girls).
Mado Maurin, 98, French actress and comedian.
Maurice J. McCauley, 90, American teacher and politician, Member of the Minnesota House of Representatives.
José Mercado, 75, Mexican Olympic cyclist.
Don Mitchell, 70, American actor (Ironside, I Dream of Jeannie, CHiPs), natural causes.
Donn Robins, 79, Australian cricketer (South Australia).
Luis Saavedra, 78, Spanish footballer (Tenerife).
Ernest Sauter, 85, German composer.
Sándor Szokolay, 82, Hungarian composer and professor.
Edward Williams, 92, English composer (Life on Earth).
Richard S. Williamson, 64, American lawyer and diplomat, United States ambassador to the United Nations for Special Political Affairs, cerebral hemorrhage.

9
Dame Florence Baron, 61, British jurist, cancer.
Kees Brusse, 88, Dutch actor and film director.
Hristu Cândroveanu, 85, Romanian editor, literary critic and writer.
Shane del Rosario, 30, American mixed martial artist and kickboxer, complications from cardiac arrest.
Pat Flaherty, 89, Australian politician, member of the New South Wales Legislative Assembly for Granville (1962–1984).
Alberto Foguelman, 90, Argentine chess master.
John Gabbert, 104, American judge, California Appellate Court (1970–1974) and Superior Court (1949–1970).
Herbert P. Gleason, 85, American lawyer, melanoma.
Norman Harding, 84, British trade unionist and political activist. 
Joe Black Hayes, 98, American football player (Tennessee Volunteers).
Barbara Hesse-Bukowska, 83, Polish classical pianist.
Takeshi Miura, 75, Japanese actor, pneumonia.
Eleanor Parker, 91, American actress (The Sound of Music, Detective Story, Caged), pneumonia.
Lloyd Pye, 67, American author and paranormal researcher.
Shiva Regmi, 49, Nepali film director, kidney failure.
María Eugenia Rubio, 80, Mexican singer and actress.
Avtandil Tskitishvili, 63, Georgian general, Chief of General Staff (1992–1993).
Peter Urban, 72, German translator.
Jacq Firmin Vogelaar, 69, Dutch writer.
Thomson M. Whitin, 90, American economist. 
John Wilbur, 70, American football player (Dallas Cowboys, Los Angeles Rams, Washington Redskins), chronic traumatic encephalopathy.

10
Mary Allitt, 80, Australian cricketer.
Jimmy Amadie, 76, American jazz musician.
Maurice Benoît, 81, Canadian Olympic silver medallist ice hockey player (1960), (Dayton Gems). 
The Child of Lov, 26, Belgian-born Dutch pop musician, complications from surgery.
Alan Coleman, 76, English-born Australian television director and producer (The Young Doctors, Neighbours).
John Didion, 66, American football player (Washington Redskins, New Orleans Saints).
Peter Drummond, 82, Australian politician, member of the Australian House of Representatives for Forrest (1972–1987).
Skeets Gallacher, 88, British boxer.
Jim Hall, 83, American jazz guitarist, composer and arranger.
Don Lund, 90, American baseball player (Detroit Tigers).
William L. Mallory, Sr., 82, American politician, member of the Ohio House of Representatives (1967–1994) and House Majority Leader (1974–1994).
Herbert J. McChrystal, 89, American army major general.
Pete Naton, 82, American baseball player (Pittsburgh Pirates).
Rossana Podestà, 79, Italian actress (Helen of Troy).
Ravella Venkatarama Rao, 86, Indian writer.
David Thurston, 95, American aircraft designer.
Srikantadatta Narasimharaja Wadiyar, 60, Indian politician, leader of Mysore Kingdom and Wadiyar dynasty (since 1974), heart attack.

11
Nadir Afonso, 93, Portuguese geometric abstractionist painter.
Kate Barry, 46, British photographer, fall.
Barbara Branden, 84, Canadian biographer, lung infection.
George H. Buck, Jr., 84, American music industry executive.
Regina Derieva, 64, Russian poet.
Frederick Fox, 82, Australian-born British milliner.
Loretta Fuddy, 65, American health official, director of the Hawaii Department of Health (since 2011), Mayor of Kalawao County (since 2011), plane crash.
Javier Jáuregui, 40, Mexican former IBF world lightweight champion boxer, stroke. 
Patrick Kavanagh, 90, British police officer, Deputy Commissioner of Police of the Metropolis (1977–1983).
John Liu Jinghe, 92, Chinese Roman Catholic Bishop.
Luigi Menti, 79, Italian footballer.
Garry Robbins, 56, Canadian professional wrestler and actor (Wrong Turn, The Love Guru, Narc), heart attack.
Musa Shariefi, 71, Indian Islamic religious scholar.
Master Sridhar, 60, Indian film actor, heart attack.

12
Molly Allott, 95, British Women's Royal Air Force officer.
Chabua Amirejibi, 92, Georgian writer.
Stephen Bruce, 59, South African cricketer.
Jim Burton, 64, American baseball player (Boston Red Sox).
Devere Christensen, 95, American water polo player.
Bernard Conlan, 90, British politician, MP for Gateshead East (1964–1987).
Krisztina Dobos, 64, Hungarian politician and economist.
Ron Goodwin, 72, American football player.
Jang Song-thaek, 67, North Korean politician, Vice-Chairman of the National Defence Commission (2010–2013), executed.
David Jones, 73, English footballer (Millwall).
Zbigniew Karkowski, 55, Polish composer, pancreatic cancer.
Tom Laughlin, 82, American actor (Billy Jack), complications from pneumonia.
Maria Lidka, 99, German-born British violinist.
Mac McGarry, 87, American television quiz show host (It's Academic), pneumonia.
Angelo Menon, 94, Italian cyclist.
Abdul Quader Molla, 65, Bangladeshi politician, execution by hanging.
Lee Raymond, 59, American stock car racing driver, cancer.
Leo Sachs, 89, Israeli molecular biologist.
Ezra Sellers, 45, American IBO cruiserweight champion boxer (2001–2002), heart failure.
Audrey Totter, 95, American actress (The Postman Always Rings Twice; Medical Center), stroke.
Charles M. Vest, 72, American academic, President of the Massachusetts Institute of Technology (1990–2004), pancreatic cancer.
Séry Wawa, 70, Ivorian footballer (Africa Sports, national team).
Rae Woodland, 91, British soprano.

13
Marcel Cellier, 88, Swiss organist and musicologist.
Daniel Escobar, 49, American actor (Lizzie McGuire, Dharma & Greg, Blow), complications of diabetes.
Marina Gordon, 96, Belarusian-born American singer and coloratura soprano.
Vivian Kellogg, 91, American AAGPBL baseball player (Fort Wayne Daisies).
Kim Kuk-tae, 89, North Korean politician and party secretary, heart failure.
Stan Leadbetter, 76, English first-class cricketer.
Grace Lenczyk, 86, American amateur golfer.
Harvey Littleton, 91, American glass artist.
Wallace T. MacCaffrey, 93, American historian.
Italo Mazzacurati, 81, Italian cyclist.
Claudio Nasco, 37, Cuban journalist and newscaster, stabbed.
Hugh Nissenson, 80, American novelist.
Zafer Önen, 92, Turkish film actor, heart failure.
Andrew Plain, 60, Australian sound editor (The Truman Show, Babe, Knowing), melanoma.
Wyn Roberts, Baron Roberts of Conwy, 83, Welsh politician, MP for Conwy (1970–1997).
James Schroder, 95, Canadian politician, MP for Guelph (1980–1984).
Thad Spencer, 70, American heavyweight boxer.
Horst Tomayer, 75, German poet, columnist, and actor, complications from cancer.

14
Janet Abu-Lughod, 85, American sociologist.
Lou Angeli, 62, American writer and filmmaker, subarachnoid hemorrhage.
G. W. S. Barrow, 89, British historian.
Janet Dailey, 69, American romance writer, complications of heart surgery.
Judi Hofer, 73, American business executive.
C. N. Karunakaran, 73, Indian painter.
Teoman Koman, 77, Turkish army general. 
Junji Kunishige, 71, Japanese scholar of American literature, hepatocellular carcinoma.
 Dennis Lindley, 90, British statistician.
Frank Lobdell, 92, American painter.
Frank Maznicki, 93, American football player (Chicago Bears, Boston Yanks).
René Million, 79, French Olympic swimmer.
John O. Norrman, 92, Swedish geographer and geomorphologist.
 Peter O'Toole, 81, British-Irish actor (Lawrence of Arabia, The Lion in Winter, Troy), BAFTA winner (1963).
Neil Robson, 85, Australian politician. 
France Roche, 92, French actress.
George Rodrigue, 69, American painter, lung cancer.
Bill Troup, 62, American football player (Baltimore Colts, Green Bay Packers).

15
Sandeep Acharya, 29, Indian singer.
Harold Camping, 92, American evangelist (Family Radio) and alleged doomsday predictor, complications from a fall.
Frank Meidell Falch, 93, Norwegian media director.
Joan Fontaine, 96, British-American actress (Rebecca, Suspicion, Ivanhoe), Oscar winner (1942).
Helmar Frank, 80, German mathematician.
Gennaro Langella, 74, American mobster.
Viking Mestad, 83, Norwegian banker and politician.
Dyron Nix, 46, American basketball player (Indiana Pacers), pneumonia.
Sis Ram Ola, 86, Indian politician, Minister of Labour and Employment (2004, 2013), Minister of Mines (2004–2009).
Valentin Pashin, 76, Russian naval constructor, Hero of the Russian Federation.
Yevgeny Yatsinenko, 88, Russian Soviet Olympic sprint canoer (1956).

16
James Isbell Armstrong, 94, American academic, President of Middlebury College (1963–1975).
Arnoldo Castro, 74, Mexican baseball player.
Pat Crowley (fashion designer), 80, Irish fashion designer.
James Flint, 100, British Royal Air Force officer.
Stuart Hilborn, 96, Canadian automotive engineer.
Derek Hornby, 83,  British business executive.
Gillis MacGill, 85, American fashion model.
Conn McCluskey, 99, Irish civil rights activist.
Ray Price, 87, American singer ("Heartaches by the Number", "For the Good Times"), pancreatic cancer.
Madhusudan Rege, 89, Indian cricketer (Maharashtra).
Marta Russell, 62, American writer and disability rights activist. 
Lolita Sevilla, 78, Spanish actress and singer.
Michiaki Takahashi, 85, Japanese virologist (chickenpox vaccine), heart failure.
Uthradom Thirunal Marthanda Varma, 91, Indian titular Maharaja of Travancore (since 1991), heart failure.
Arie Vermeer, 91, Dutch footballer.
Zvi Yanai, 78, Israeli publicist and philosopher.

17
Alfred Bates, 69, British politician, MP for Bebington and Ellesmere Port (1974–1979).
Richard Britnell, 69, British historian.
Fred Bruemmer, 84, Canadian nature photographer.
Ārvaldis Andrejs Brumanis, 87, Latvian Roman Catholic prelate, Bishop of Liepāja (1995–2001).
Ricardo María Carles Gordó, 87, Spanish Catholic cardinal, Archbishop of Barcelona (1990–2004).
Kelly Clark, 56, American attorney, cancer.
Rudolf Filkus, 86, Slovak politician.
Richard Heffner, 88, American historian and television host (The Open Mind), cerebral hemorrhage.
Azean Irdawaty, 63, Malaysian actress, liver failure.
Tetsurō Kashibuchi, 63, Japanese musician, composer (Tsuribaka Nisshi), and producer (Yukiko Okada), esophageal cancer.
Frank Magleby, 85, American painter and educator.
Janet Rowley, 88, American cancer researcher, complications of ovarian cancer.
Paul Ryan, 70, American video artist and communications theorist.
Eyad al-Sarraj, 70, Palestinian human rights campaigner, leukemia.
Frank Sheehan, 80, Canadian politician, member of the Legislative Assembly of Ontario for Lincoln (1995–1999), cancer.
Conny van Rietschoten, 87, Dutch yacht racer.

18
 Ronnie Biggs, 84, English criminal (Great Train Robbery) and fugitive.
 Harry Boland, 88, Irish Olympic basketball player (1948).
 Sir Christopher Curwen, 84, British Head of the Secret Intelligence Service (1985–1989).
William T. Greenough, 69, American educator,  Lewy body dementia.
Jerome Grossman, 96, American political activist.
 Ken Hutcherson, 61, American football player and anti-gay activist, prostate cancer.
 Gonzalo Inzunza Inzunza, 42, Mexican drug lord and Sinaloa Cartel leader, shot. 
 Boyuk Jeddikar, 84, Iranian footballer (Esteghlal F.C., national team), Alzheimer's disease.
Martin Koeman, 75, Dutch footballer, heart failure.
Larry Lujack, 73, American disc jockey, esophageal cancer.
Graham Mackay, 64, South African businessman (SABMiller).
Konstantin Melgunov, 87, Russian Olympic sailor.
Titus Munteanu, 72, Romanian television producer (TVR), director and filmmaker, respiratory disease. 
Donald Roe Ross, 91, American federal judge.
Brunon Synak, 70, Polish sociologist and politician.
 Paul Torday, 67, British author.
Wade Walker, 90, American football player, coach, and college athletics administrator.

19
 Winton Dean, 97, English musicologist.
 Herb Geller, 85, American jazz saxophonist, pneumonia.
Morton J. Gold, 96, American Air Force brigadier general.
 Al Goldstein, 77, American publisher and pornographer, renal failure.
José de Jesús Gutiérrez Rebollo, 79, Mexican general and drug trafficker, brain cancer.
Arnošt Hložek, 84, Slovak football coach and player.
Marty Hornstein, 76, American film producer (Star Trek: First Contact, Along Came a Spider).
Ralph Howard, 82, Australian politician, member of the Victorian Legislative Council (1976–1982).
Hideo Kanaya, 68, Japanese motorcycle racer.
Leon Kuhn, 59, British political cartoonist.
 Nae Lăzărescu, 72, Romanian actor and comedian, chronic liver disease.
 Krzysztof Marcinkowski, 53, Polish footballer (Lech Poznan).
 Pedro Septién, 97, Mexican sports broadcaster, pneumonia.
Olive Smuts-Kennedy, 88, New Zealand politician.
 Ružica Sokić, 79, Serbian actress, Alzheimer's disease.
 Ned Vizzini, 32, American novelist (It's Kind of a Funny Story), suicide by jumping.
 Günther Ziegler, 80, German Olympic cyclist.

20
Amand Audaire, 89, French cyclist.
Pyotr Bolotnikov, 83, Soviet Olympic champion athlete (1960).
 Harji Ram Burdak, 82, Indian politician.
Tibor Czinkán, 84, Hungarian basketball player.
Yuri Dubinin, 83, Russian diplomat, Ambassador to the United States (1986–1990).
Marie Fleming, 59, Irish campaigner for assisted suicide, multiple sclerosis.
Barbara Heslop, 88, New Zealand immunologist.
Khaled Khan, 55, Bangladeshi actor, motor neuron disease.
Lord Infamous, 40, American rapper (Three 6 Mafia), heart attack.
Gyula Maár, 79, Hungarian film director.
Didi Menosi, 85, Israeli dramatist, journalist and songwriter, Parkinson's disease.
Nelly Omar, 102, Argentine actress and singer, cardiac arrest.
Masafumi Ōura, 44, Japanese volleyball player (national team), stomach cancer.
David Richards, 57, British record producer (Queen, Iggy Pop).
Reginaldo Rossi, 69, Brazilian singer-songwriter, lung cancer.
Vivian St. John, 63, American professional wrestler.
Jeff Shannon, 52, American film critic and writer (The Seattle Times).
Syeda Zohra Tajuddin, 80, Bangladeshi politician.

21
Trigger Alpert, 97, American jazz double-bassist (Glenn Miller band). 
Ahmed Asmat Abdel-Meguid, 89, Egyptian diplomat. 
Eli Beeding, 85, American scientist and test pilot. 
Edgar Bronfman Sr., 84, Canadian businessman (Seagram) and activist for Jewish and Israeli causes.
Bethine Clark Church, 90, American political activist.
David Coleman, 87, British television sports commentator and presenter.
Craig Cotton, 66, American football tight end.
Treffor Davies, 75, British cricketer (Worcestershire).
Lars Edlund, 91, Swedish composer and organist. 
John Eisenhower, 91, American historian and diplomat, Ambassador to Belgium (1969–1971).
Peter Geach, 97, British philosopher.
Charles Grant Gordon, 86, Scottish whisky distiller, pneumonia.
Richard Hart, 96, Jamaican historian and politician.
Rodolfo P. Hernández, 82, American soldier, recipient of the Medal of Honor (1952).
Ina Scot, 24, Swedish racehorse, winner of Prix d'Amérique (1995), euthanized.
Björn J:son Lindh, 69, Swedish musician and composer, brain tumor.
Bernard Henry McGinn, 56, Irish republican and IRA member, convicted of conspiracy to murder and firearms possession. (body discovered on this date)
Bronzell Miller, 42, American football player and actor (Bringing Down the House, Mr. 3000), multiple myeloma.
El Perlo de Triana, 87, Spanish singer and poet.
Aristóteles Picho, 56, Peruvian actor, director and drama teacher, heart attack.
Lentxu Rubial, 68, Spanish politician, Senator (2004–2011).
Geoff Stirling, 92, Canadian businessman (CJON-DT, CHOZ-FM) and publisher (Newfoundland Herald).
Kazutami Watanabe, 81, Japanese scholar of French literature, sepsis.
Woon Sui Kut, 84, Singaporean sports official.

22
Muriel Abdurahman, 75, Canadian politician, member of the Legislative Assembly of Alberta for Clover Bar-Fort Saskatchewan (1993–1997).
Pran Chopra, 92, Indian journalist and newspaper editor (The Statesman).
Diomedes Díaz, 56, Colombian vallenato musician, heart attack.
Shem Downey, 91, Irish hurler (Kilkenny).· 
 R. A. Foakes, 90, British author and Shakespearean scholar.
John Grefe, 66, American chess player, liver cancer. 
Ed Herrmann, 67, American baseball player (Chicago White Sox), prostate cancer.
Hans Hækkerup, 68, Danish politician, Defence Minister (1993–2000), MP (1979–2001), multiple system atrophy.
Leonard Jackson, 85, American stage, film, and television actor, Alzheimer's disease.
Anton Mackowiak, 91, German Olympic wrestler.
Keith McGowan, 70, Australian radio presenter (3AW), stroke.
Oscar Peer, 85, Swiss writer.
Lázaro Rivas, 38, Cuban Olympic silver medallist wrestler (2000).
William Rosales, 59, Puerto Rican politician, Mayor of Camuy (1989–2002).
Antti Sivonen, 85, Finnish Olympic skier.
Bill Tremel, 84, American baseball player (Chicago Cubs).
Marco Zappia, 76, American television editor (Home Improvement, All in the Family, Who's the Boss?).

23
Stan Brooks, 86, American radio broadcaster (WINS).
Alan Burns, 83, English author.
Rick Cassidy, 70, American pornographic actor and bodybuilder.
Chryssa, 79, Greek-American artist.
Inis L. Claude, 91, American political scientist.
Addison Cresswell, 53, British comedy agent and manager, heart attack.
Mikhail Kalashnikov, 94, Russian weapons designer (AK-47, AK-74).
Yusef Lateef, 93, American Grammy Award-winning saxophonist (Yusef Lateef's Little Symphony).
Juris Lauciņš, 56, Latvian actor, throat cancer.
Ricky Lawson, 59, American drummer (Michael Jackson, Phil Collins), brain aneurysm.
Neil McLaughlin, 65, Irish Olympic boxer.
José Ortiz, 81, Spanish comics artist (Hombre, Tex Willer).
András Pándy, 86, Hungarian-born Belgian serial killer, natural causes.
Chuck Patterson, 68, American actor (Law & Order), heart attack.
Raymond Paul, 85, British Olympic fencer (1952, 1956).
Jeff Pollack, 54, American director and producer (Booty Call, The Fresh Prince of Bel-Air), natural causes.
Ted Richmond, 103, American film producer (Papillon).
Vito Rizzuto, 67, Canadian mafia leader, pneumonia.
Viktor Sarianidi, 84, Russian archaeologist.
G. S. Shivarudrappa, 87, Indian Kannada language poet.
Summer Bird, 7, American Thoroughbred racehorse, colic.
Francisco Manuel Vieira, 88, Brazilian Roman Catholic prelate, Bishop of Osasco (1989–2002).
Robert W. Wilson, 86, American multimillionaire philanthropist, suicide by jumping.

24
Rex Armistead, 83, American private detective and police officer (Arkansas Project). 
 Eric Auld, 82, Scottish artist.
Frédéric Back, 89, Canadian animator (Crac, The Man Who Planted Trees), cancer.
Ian Barbour, 90, American scholar and author, stroke.
Sir Michael Butler, 86, British diplomat, Permanent Representative to the European Economic Community (1979–1985).
Thomas Ludlow Chrystie II, 80, American banker.
Germán Coppini, 52, Spanish pop musician and singer (Siniestro Total, Golpes Bajos), hepatic cancer.
André Dreiding, 94, Swiss chemist.
Gunnar Ericsson, 94, Swedish politician and sports official.
Patrick Etolu, 78, Ugandan Olympic high jumper.
Soane Lilo Foliaki, 80, Tongan Roman Catholic prelate, Bishop of Tonga (1994–2008).
John M. Goldman, 75, British medical scientist.
Jakob Sigurd Holmgard, 84, Norwegian farmer and politician.
Stuart Jakeman, 70, English cricketer (Northants).
Raino Koskenkorva, 87, Finnish Olympic cyclist.
Fleming Lee, 79,  American author.
Allan McKeown, 67, British film producer (Tracey Takes On...), prostate cancer.
Ron Noades, 76, British football chairman (Crystal Palace), lung cancer.
Helga M. Novak, 78, German-Icelandic writer.
Walter Oi, 84, American economist.
Hansjörg Reichel, 91, Austrian Olympic ice hockey player.
Jean Rustin, 85, French painter.
Valter Santos, 59, Brazilian actor, heart attack.
R.A. Shooter, 97, British microbiologist.
Serghei Stroenco, 46, Moldovan football player (national team) and manager.
Edward Williams, 88, English cricketer.

25
Don Adams, 66, American basketball player.
Kaj Backlund, 68, Finnish jazz trumpeter (UMO Jazz Orchestra).
Anthony J. Bryant, 52, American author.
Richard F. Edlich, 74, American plastic surgeon.
Birger Gerhardsson, 87, Swedish Biblical scholar.
Luis Humberto Gómez Gallo, 51, Colombian industrial engineer, Senator (1994–2008), heart attack.
Wayne Harrison, 46, English footballer (Liverpool).
David R. Harris, 83, British geographer, anthropologist and archaeologist.
Mike Hegan, 71, American baseball player (Milwaukee Brewers, New York Yankees) and announcer (Cleveland Indians), heart failure.
*Jorge Loring Miró, 92, Spanish Jesuit priest, stroke.
Boris Magasanik, 94, American microbiologist.
Andy Malcolm, 80, English footballer (West Ham United).
Mel Mathay, 80, Filipino politician, Mayor of Quezon City (1992–2001), heart attack.
Linda McCullough Thew, 95, British author.
John Rutherford, 78, English cricketer.
Cliff Salmond, 85, Canadian Olympic athlete.
Viktor Savelyev, 85, Russian surgeon, Hero of Socialist Labor, recipient of the Demidov Prize in Medicine (2002).
Adnan Şenses, 78, Turkish musician and actor, stomach cancer.
Wilbur Thompson, 92, American Olympic champion shot putter (1948).
Val Joe Walker, 83, American football player.
Art Weiner, 87, American football player.
Slim Williamson, 86, American recording executive.

26
Malena Alvarado, 59, Venezuelan actress, complications during surgery.
Albino Aroso, 90, Portuguese doctor and politician.
Paul Blair, 69, American baseball player (Baltimore Orioles, New York Yankees), heart attack.
Gerardo Bönnhoff, 87, German-born Argentine athlete.
E. Otis Charles, 87, American clergyman and activist, Espiscopal Bishop of Utah (1971–1993).
Dinu Cocea, 84, Romanian director and screenwriter, heart failure.
*Dr. Tangalanga, 97, Argentine comedian.
Marta Eggerth, 101, Hungarian-born American singer and actress.
Brian Glüss, 83, British statistician, mathematician, systems engineer and author.
Bruce Hopkins, 89, Australian rugby league footballer.
Theo Lalleman, 67, Dutch writer.
Herbert F. Travers, Jr., 85, American attorney and judge.
Sally Vincent, 76, British journalist.
Harold Whitaker, 93, British animator (Animal Farm, Heavy Metal).

27
Richard Ambler, 80, British chemist.
Carter Camp, 72, American activist, chair of the American Indian Movement (1973). 
Gonzalo Carrasco, 78, Chilean footballer.
Mohamad Chatah, 62, Lebanese politician, Minister of Finance (2008–2009), Ambassador to the United States (1997–2000), car bomb.
Abu Lais Md. Mubin Chowdhury, 71–72, Bangladeshi politician, heart attack.
Patrick Crowby, 55, Ni-Vanuatu politician, Interior Minister (2008, 2011, 2013).
Alexander Lamb Cullen, 93, British electrical engineer.
Gianna D'Angelo, 84, American opera singer.
Boyd Lee Dunlop, 87, American jazz pianist.
Rollo Gebhard, 92, German circumnavigator and author.
Peter Hall, 83, British Anglican bishop, Bishop of Woolwich in the Diocese of Southwark, England (1984–1996).
Peter John Harding, 73, British Royal Air Force officer, Defence Services Secretary (1994–1998).
John Matheson, 96, Canadian lawyer, judge and politician, MP for Leeds (1961–1968).
Åke Nordin, 77, Swedish entrepreneur, founder of Fjällräven outdoor equipment.
Gunn Olsen, 61, Norwegian politician. MP for Telemark (1997–2013), cancer.
Elvira Quintillá, 85, Spanish actress.
Alan Richards, 91, New Zealand cricketer.
Farooq Sheikh, 65, Indian actor, heart attack.
Jonathan Stevens, 36, British medical researcher, Parkinson's disease.
Ian B. Tanner, 87, Australian Presbyterian minister.
Keegan Taylor, 29, Zimbabwean cricketer (Manicaland), heart failure.
Fernando Ureña Rib, 62, Dominican painter.

28
Halton Arp, 86, American astronomer.
Jack S. Blanton, 86, American businessman and philanthropist.
Esther Borja, 100, Cuban singer.
Robert Boscawen, 90, British politician, MP for Wells  (1970–1983), Somerton and Frome (1983–1992).
Laurent Chappis, 98, French architect and town planner.
Aníbal Delgado Fiallos, 77, Honduran politician. 
Doe B, 22, American rapper, shot.
Sheila Guyse, 88, American actress and singer, Alzheimer's disease.
Andrew Jacobs, Jr., 81, American politician, member of the House of Representatives from Indiana (1965–1973, 1975–1997).
George Jacobs (valet), 86, American memoirist and valet.
Margrit Kennedy, 74, German architect and academic. 
Kazuyoshi Kino, 91, Japanese Buddhist scholar, pneumonia.
Alfred Marshall, 94, American clothing retailer, founder of Marshalls.
Eleanor Montgomery, 67, American Olympic high jumper.
Joseph Ruskin, 89, American actor (The Magnificent Seven, The Scorpion King, Alias).
Mair Russell-Jones, 96, Welsh codebreaker.
Yosef Shapira, 87, Israeli politician, minister without portfolio (1984–1988). 
Harold Simmons, 82, American businessman and philanthropist.
Ilya Tsymbalar, 44, Ukrainian-born Russian footballer, Footballer of the Year in Russia (1995), heart disease.

29
Alevtina Aparina, 72, Russian politician.
Richard Coar, 92, American aerospace engineer.
Paul Comstive, 52, English footballer, heart attack.
John W. V. Cordice, 94, American doctor and surgeon, natural causes.
Benjamin Curtis, 35, American rock musician (Tripping Daisy, Secret Machines, School of Seven Bells), lymphoma.
Connie Dierking, 77, American basketball player (Philadelphia 76ers, Cincinnati Royals).
Andy Granatelli, 90, American motorsport promoter and businessman, CEO of STP, heart failure.
C. T. Hsia, 92, Chinese literary critic and academic.
Wojciech Kilar, 81, Polish composer (Bram Stoker's Dracula, The Pianist), brain tumor.
Besik Kudukhov, 27, Russian Olympic wrestler (2008, 2012), traffic collision.
Henri Lazarof, 81, Bulgarian composer, Alzheimer's disease.
Kay Mander, 98, British film director and shooting continuity specialist.
Jagadish Mohanty, 62, Indian Oriya language writer, hit by train. 
Mike O'Connor, 67, American journalists' advocate, heart attack.
William Overstreet Jr., 92, American WWII flying ace.
Khushi Ram, 77, Indian basketball player.
Ari Romero, 62, Mexican professional wrestler, liver cancer.
Armando Villegas, 87, Peruvian-Colombian painter.
Mary Wibberley, 79, British novelist.

30
Akeem Adams, 22, Trinidadian footballer, stroke.
Katja Andy, 106, German-born American classical pianist.
Martin Berkofsky, 70, American classical pianist, cancer.
W. Harrison Daniel, 91, American author and history professor.
John Dominis, 92, American photojournalist, complications from heart attack.
Kenneth C. Edelin, 74, American physician and patient rights advocate.
Charlie Hill, 62, American Oneida-Mohawk-Cree comedian, lymphoma.
Sjoerd Huisman, 27, Dutch long distance ice-skater, cardiac arrest.
Kinnaird R. McKee, 84, American United States Navy admiral.
José María Maguregui, 79, Spanish football player (Athletic Bilbao) and coach (Racing de Santander).
Eero Mäntyranta, 76, Finnish Olympic champion (1960, 1964) cross-country skier.
Tito Mora, 73, Spanish pop singer, pulmonary illness.
Gerald Mortimer, 77, British author and sports journalist (Derby Telegraph).
G. Nammalvar, 75, Indian agronomist and sustainability activist, cardiac arrest.
Eiichi Ohtaki, 65, Japanese musician (Happy End), choking.
Johnny Orr, 86, American basketball player and coach (University of Michigan, Iowa State University), complications of a head injury from fall.
Paul Sally, 80, American mathematics professor.
Jaime Quijandría Salmón, 70, Peruvian economist and politician, Minister of Energy (2001–2003, 2004), Minister of Economy (2003–2004), pulmonary fibrosis.
Haakon Sandberg, 89, Norwegian film director.
Menan Schriewer, 79, American football player.
Lakshmi Shankar, 87, Indian classical vocalist.
Ayhan Sökmen, 84, Turkish composer and physician.
Jan Steyn, 85, South African judge, Supreme Court Justice (1964–1977).
Ibrahima Sylla, 57, Ivorian record producer.
Geoffrey Wheeler, 83, British broadcaster (Songs of Praise, Top of the Form, Winner Takes All).
Larry Yaji, 87, American baseball player (Nishitetsu Lions).

31
Antonio Allocca, 76, Italian actor.
James Avery, 68, American actor (The Fresh Prince of Bel Air, Teenage Mutant Ninja Turtles, The Closer), complications from surgery.
Roberto Ciotti, 60,  Italian bluesman and composer (Marrakech Express).
Puccio Corona, 71, Italian journalist.
Jim Coutts, 75, Canadian lawyer, businessman and advisor to two prime ministers, cancer.
John Fortune, 74, British comedian (Bremner, Bird and Fortune) and actor (Match Point), leukaemia.
Silva Golde, 58, Latvian politician and educator.
Joaquim Gonçalves, 77, Portuguese Roman Catholic prelate, Bishop of Vila Real (1991–2011).
Bob Grant, 84, American radio talk show host.
Hans Hellbrand, 88, Swedish Olympic water polo player.
Sigrid Kahle, 85, French-born Swedish journalist and writer.
Patrick Karegeya, 53, Rwandan dissident, Director-General (External Intelligence) of the Defence Force (1994–2004), strangulation.
Irina Korschunow, 88, German writer.
Hardev Singh Kular, 83, Kenyan Olympic hockey player.
Hermann Müller, 78, German politician, Mayor of Idstein (1978–2002).
T.C. Narendran, 69, Indian taxonomist, heart attack. 
Al Porcino, 88, American jazz trumpeter, fall.
Ljubomir Tadić, 88, Serbian academic.
Lidiya Vertinskaya, 90, Russian actress.
Werner Wittig, 83, German painter and printmaker.

References

2013-12
 12